Eduard Kink (8 November 1895 Vana-Kariste Parish (now Mulgi Parish), Kreis Pernau – 13 January 1942 Solikamsk, Russian SFSR) was an Estonian politician. He was a member of the III and IV Riigikogu, representing the Estonian Socialist Workers' Party. He was a member of the Riigikogu since 1 July 1926. He replaced Alma Ostra-Oinas.

References

1895 births
1942 deaths
People from Mulgi Parish
People from Kreis Pernau
Estonian Socialist Workers' Party politicians
Members of the Riigikogu, 1926–1929
Members of the Riigikogu, 1929–1932
Estonian people who died in Soviet detention
People who died in the Gulag